Nur ibn Mujahid ibn ‘Ali ibn ‘Abdullah al Dhuhi Suha (Harari: ኑር ኢብን ሙጃሂድ, ; died 1567) was a Muslim Emir of Harar who ruled Adal Sultanate. He was the primary reason for the construction of the five-gated wall that surrounds the city of Harar. He was known for marrying his uncle's widow, Bati del Wambara, and he also succeeded Imam Ahmad as leader of the Muslim forces fighting Christian Ethiopia.

Biography
Emir Nur was considered a saint from Harar, Mujahid was called the Sahib al-Fath al-Thani, or "Master of the Second Conquest". When Imam Ahmad, who had led the Muslim conquest of the Ethiopian Highlands, was killed in 1543, the Muslim forces fell back in confusion to Harar. Nur, the dead leader’s sister’s son, married Ahmad ibn Ibrahim al-Ghazi's widow, Bati del Wambara, and undertook to renew the fortunes of the Muslim city, which had been sacked in 1550. Promoted to Emir around 1550-51, he spent the next two years reorganizing his forces, and constructing the defensive wall which still surrounds the city.

In 1554-55, Nur departed on a Jihad (holy war), in the eastern Ethiopian lowlands of Bale, and Hadiya. In 1559, he invaded Fatagar, where he fought against the Ethiopian emperor Galawdewos, and killed him at the Battle of Fatagar. Nur continued fighting for 12 years until, according to legend, at Gibe he said "Kaffa!", or "Enough!", and returned to Harar. Some believe the province is called Kaffa for this reason.

During Nur’s absence, Harar witnessed internal power struggles, and the unlucky city was disturbed by encroaching Oromo clans. It was at this time that the walls of Harar were built; tradition attributes them to Nur ibn Mujahid with the help of two chiefs, Aw Abadir and Aw 'Ali. By 1567, repeated Oromo raids had brought famine to the city. Nur left the city for three months on a punitive raid against the invaders. On his return he found an epidemic afflicting Harar, and he himself died of typhus that year.

Legacy

Contemporaries described Nur as a man of noble conduct, who was just, strong, and highly principled. Besides the wall which protected the city's inhabitants from invaders over the following centuries, he was noted for a number of buildings he erected in Harar. His tomb stands on a hill surrounded by houses and courtyards, and is a popular place of pilgrimage in Harar.

References

Emirs of Harar
1567 deaths
16th-century monarchs in Africa
People from the Adal Sultanate
Year of birth unknown